Catherine Doty (born South Paterson, New Jersey) is an American poet and cartoonist currently residing in Boonton, New Jersey.  She attended Upsala College and later the University of Iowa where she received an MFA (Master of Fine Arts) in poetry. She is the recipient of an Academy of American Poets Prize and fellowships from the National Endowment for the Arts, the New Jersey State Council on the Arts, and the New York Foundation for the Arts.

Awards 
 Academy of American Poets Prize
 Fellowship from the New Jersey State Council on the Arts (2012)
 Fellowship from the New York Foundation for the Arts
 National Endowment for the Arts Fellowship in Poetry (2011)

Published works

References

Sources

External links
Official Website

1952 births
Living people
American women cartoonists
Upsala College alumni
University of Iowa alumni
American women poets
American cartoonists
21st-century American women